Otto Tschumi (born 4 August 1904 in Bittwil, Seeberg; died 18 February 1985 in Bern) was a Swiss painter, considered one of the most important Swiss surrealists.

Tschumi grew up in modest circumstances in Bern and attended school there. He broke off his training as a sign painter and lithographer but was able to earn his living as a graphic artist. Self-taught, he began to develop his style as a painter in the 1920s. In 1933 he married the dancer Beatrice Gutekunst, with whom he stayed until the end of his life. From 1936 to 1940 he lived in Paris. Under the influence of Max Ernst, Jean Arp and other surrealists, he found his own formal language during this time.

In 1946 he was able to exhibit for the first time in the Kunsthalle Bern. He became internationally known in the 1950s and in 1960 he contributed to the Venice Biennale. After his death in 1987 he was honored in retrospectives at the Museum of Fine Arts Bern and the Kunsthalle Nürnberg.
This article was initially translated from the German Wikipedia.

20th-century Swiss painters
Swiss male painters
1904 births
1985 deaths
20th-century Swiss male artists